Tom Tarrant (29 September 1931 – 23 August 2017) was an Australian rules footballer who played for the Collingwood Football Club in the Victorian Football League (VFL).

Notes

External links  
 

1931 births
2017 deaths
Australian rules footballers from Victoria (Australia)
Collingwood Football Club players
Mansfield Football Club players